Abdul Latif Biswas may refer to:

 Abdul Latif Biswas (Politician in Pakistan), member of the 2nd National Assembly of Pakistan as a representative of East Pakistan
 Muhammad Abdul Latif Biswas (born 1953), Bangladeshi politician, diplomat, and freedom fighter